Bicyclus anisops, the red-ringed bush brown, is a butterfly in the family Nymphalidae. It is found in eastern Nigeria and western Cameroon. The habitat consists of submontane forests above 1,300 meters.

References

Elymniini
Butterflies described in 1892
Butterflies of Africa